The Scottish Parliament is the devolved legislature of Scotland. It was founded in 1999. The 129 members of the Scottish Parliament (MSPs) are elected using the additional member system. 73 MSPs are elected through the first-past-the-post system in the Parliament's single-member constituencies, while 56 are elected in the regions to ensure results are proportional. There are 8 regions, electing 7 MSPs each. By-elections to the Parliament occur when a constituency seat becomes vacant, due to the death or resignation of a member.

There were no by-elections in the 3rd Scottish Parliament term (2007–11).

By-elections
Where seats changed political party at the by-election, the result is highlighted: red for a Labour gain, and blue for a Conservative gain

See also
 Regional Member changes in the Scottish Parliament
 List of by-elections to the Senedd
 Elections in Scotland

References

Notes

Citations

 
Scottish Parliament
Par